The Singer Not the Song is a 1953 novel by the British writer Audrey Erskine Lindop. It was published in the United States by Pocket Books under the alternative title of The Bandit and the Priest. A priest sent to a small Mexican town engages in a moral battle with a local bandit.

It was adapted into a 1961 film The Singer Not the Song directed by Roy Ward Baker and starring Dirk Bogarde, John Mills and Mylène Demongeot.

References

1953 British novels
Novels by Audrey Erskine Lindop
Novels set in Mexico
British novels adapted into films
Heinemann (publisher) books